Agagus is a genus of sea snails, marine gastropod molluscs in the family Trochidae, the top snails.

Species
Species within the genus Agagus include:
 Agagus agagus Jousseaume, 1894
 Agagus stellamaris Herbert, 1991
Martin Zuschin, Ronald Janssen and Christian Baal (2009) also mention an Agagus n.sp found in the Red Sea, that differs from A. agagus by its smooth base and from A. stellamaris (found in the Indian Ocean) by its higher conical shape.

References

External links
 Jousseaume [F.P.] 1894. Diagnoses des coquilles de nouveaux mollusques. Bulletin de la Société Philomathique de Paris, 8(6): 98-105
 Herbert D.G. (1991) A revision of the genus Agagus Jousseaume, 1894 (Mollusca: Gastropoda: Trochidae). Journal of Natural History 25: 883-900
 D.G. Herbert (1990), A revision of the genus Agagus Jousseaume, 1894 (Mollusca: Gastropoda: Trochidae); Journal of Natural History Volume 25, Issue 4, 1991

Gastropod genera
Taxa named by Félix Pierre Jousseaume
Trochidae